WLKM-FM is a radio station owned by Impact Radio and licensed to Three Rivers, Michigan. The featured music is adult contemporary. The format switched from classic hits on June 17, 2012, when the Dial Global Classic Hits format the station had been carrying was discontinued.  Programming now comes from Westwood One's AC format. Prior to it being an adult contemporary formatted station, WLKM was formerly a top-40 station with an affiliate of Scott Shannon's Rockin' America Top 30 Countdown in the 1980s.

Sources
Michiguide.com - WLKM-FM History

External links

LKM-FM
Mainstream adult contemporary radio stations in the United States
Radio stations established in 1991